An Evening with Anita Baker was a concert tour in 2007–2009 by American R&B singer Anita Baker. The outing started in the summer of 2007, visiting Europe and North America.

Baker performed two free shows in Brooklyn, New York on August 13, for the 25th Annual Martin Luther King Concert Series and August 16, for the 29th Annual Seaside Summer Concert Series.

The tour resumed in 2008, Baker also performed shows in the Caribbeans and Africa, and a North America second leg outing that ended in November 2009.

Opening act
Charlie Wilson (Brooklyn, New York)

Set list
"Mystery"
"Sweet Love"
"Been So Long"
"No One in the World"
"Same Ole Love (365 Days of Year)"
"Caught Up in the Rapture"
"Talk to Me"
"Priceless"
"Good Love"
"Angel"
"Body and Soul"
"It's Been You"
"I Apologize" 1 
"Lonely"
"No More Tears"
"Fairy Tales"
Encore
"Giving You the Best That I Got"
"You Bring Me Joy"

1 performed on select dates in North America and Europe.

Notes
 February 14, 2009 at Radio City Music Hall in New York City, Baker performed her hit song "Angel" with singer Mary J. Blige. 
 November 7, 2009 at Nokia Theatre in Los Angeles, her performance of "Fairy Tales" included singers Tyrese, Chante Moore and George Duke.

Band
 Music Director/Drums: Ricky Lawson
 Bass guitar: Nathan East

Tour dates

Recording and future release
 Her performance at DTE Energy Music Theatre in Clarkston, Michigan, on July 12, 2008, was recorded. On September 19, 2008, BusyBoy Productions filmed her entire An Evening with Anita Baker concert at Mystic Lake Casino Hotel in Prior Lake, Minnesota, for Baker's up-and-coming DVD and B-roll footage for promotional purposes. However, these projects have not been commercially released yet.

References

External links
 www.AnitaBaker.com

2007 concert tours
2008 concert tours
Anita Baker concert tours